Simplified Wade, abbreviated SW, is a modification of the Wade–Giles romanization system for writing Standard Mandarin Chinese. It was devised by the Swedish linguist Olov Bertil Anderson (1920–1993), who first published the system in 1969. Simplified Wade uses tonal spelling: in other words it modifies the letters in a syllable in order to indicate tone differences. It is one of only two Mandarin romanization systems that indicate tones in such a way (the other being Gwoyeu Romatzyh).  All other systems use diacritics or numbers to indicate tone.

Initials

This modification, previously used in the Legge romanization, was also adopted by Joseph Needham in his Science and Civilisation in China series. The table below illustrates the spelling difference.

While Wade–Giles spells the initials differently before the vowel  (written ŭ in WG but y in SW), Simplified Wade spells them the same as everywhere else:

Like most romanization systems for Standard Mandarin, Simplified Wade uses r for Wade–Giles j: WG jih, jê, jên, jêng, jo, jui, jung, etc., become SW ry, re, ren, reng, ro, ruei, rung, etc.

All other initials are the same as in Wade–Giles.

Finals

The finals of Simplified Wade differ from those of Wade–Giles in the following ways:

 An -h at the end of a Wade–Giles final is dropped in Simplified Wade: WG -ieh, yeh, -üeh, yüeh, êrh become SW -ie, ye, -üe (but see below), yüe (but see below), er.

 A circumflex in a Wade–Giles final is dropped in Simplified Wade: WG ê, -ên, wên, -êng, wêng, êrh become SW e, -en, wen, -eng, weng, er.

 The Wade–Giles ê/o final is always e in Simplified Wade: for Wade–Giles ko, ko, ho; ê or o; tê, tê, chê, chê tsê, tsê, jê, etc., Simplified Wade has ke, khe, he; e; te, the, che, chhe, tse, tshe, re, etc.

 The Wade–Giles ui/uei final is always uei in Simplified Wade (except when it forms a syllable on its own; then it is wei in both WG and SW). Wade–Giles writes kuei and kuei but otherwise -ui (hui, shui, jui, etc.), while Simplified Wade writes not only kuei and khuei but also huei, shuei, ruei, etc.

 While Wade–Giles writes the syllable  as i or yi depending on the character, Simplified Wade consistently uses yi.

 Like Gwoyeu Romatzyh, Simplified Wade uses -y for Wade–Giles -ih and -ŭ: WG chih, chih, shih, jih, tzŭ, tzŭ, ssŭ become SW chy, chhy, shy, ry, tsy, tshy, sy.

Equivalents of Wade–Giles ü

When ü is available, it is used as in Wade–Giles. Otherwise, the following rules apply:

 The Wade–Giles syllable yu becomes you and WG yü becomes yu: WG yu, yü, yüeh, yüan, yün become you, yu, yue, yuan, yun (yung remains yung).

Tones

Both Gwoyeu Romatzyh and Simplified Wade use tonal spelling, but in two very different fashions. There are different rules for different cases: WG pin1, pin2, pin3, pin4 become GR pin, pyn, piin, pinn, but WG sui1, sui2, sui3, sui4 become GR suei, swei, soei, suey.

In Simplified Wade, on the other hand, the 2nd, 3rd and 4th tones are always indicated by an otherwise silent letter following the final: -v for the 2nd tone, -x for the 3rd tone, and -z for the 4th tone. The spelling of the tone and the spelling of the final are always separable from each other. Simplified Wade's tonal spelling is therefore similar to the adding of a digit at the end of the syllable.

The 1st tone is always indicated by the absence of a letter following the final. Examples:

When a vertical apostrophe is used above one or more syllables, any syllable without a vertical apostrophe carries the neutral tone: Hànyǔ Pīnyīn lái le is la̍iv-le in Simplified Wade.

The right apostrophe 

A right apostrophe is used to indicate a syllable break in an otherwise ambiguous spelling, e.g.,  for WG pi1-ao3, freeing up the spelling  to unambiguously mean WG . Due to the tone letters, this is only needed when the first syllable carries tone 1.

See also 

Wade–Giles
Wade–Giles table
Comparison of Chinese transcription systems
Spelling in Gwoyeu Romatzyh

Notes

Citations

Bibliography

External links
A review of Anderson (1970), explaining Simplified Wade with an example

Romanization of Chinese